Le Concert de Caesarea is the first live album and DVD by singer Emma Shapplin. It is a recording of Shapplin's first concert in Israel, a concert held in the ancient city of Caesarea in 1999. The album was written, composed and produced by Jean-Patrick Capdevielle.

Track listing
Vedi, Maria... 	
Ira di Dio
Spente le stelle	
Miserere, Venere...
Cuor senza sangue
Lucifero, quel giorno
Spente le stelle
Alleluia
Dolce veneno
Fera ventura
Discovering Yourself

DVD setlist
Vedi, Maria... 	
Ira di Dio
Spente le stelle	
Miserere, Venere...
Cuor senza sangue
Lucifero, quel giorno
Spente le stelle
Alleluia
Spente le stelle (videoclip)
Cuor senza sangue (videoclip)
Discovering Yourself (videoclip)

References

External links

Emma Shapplin albums
2003 live albums